BMW Manufacturing (Thailand) Co., Ltd. is an automobile manufacturing company based Rayong, in the Rayong Province of eastern Thailand and a subsidiary of BMW Group Thailand.

History 
The BMW Group Thailand was founded in 1998 as a subsidiary of BMW AG and consists of three companies: BMW (Thailand) Co., Ltd. for Sales, BMW Manufacturing (Thailand) Co., Ltd. for the production and BMW Leasing (Thailand) Co., Ltd. for financial services.

The work was started in May 2000 with the production of BMW 3 Series. In October 2002, the long version of the 7 Series was added. A little later, production of the 5 Series started in April 2004. In 2005, the 3 Series was then replaced by the fifth generation. In January 2006, the BMW X3 was joined by the fourth model. There were new generation changes in January 2010 in the 5 Series as in August of the same year in the 7 Series. In the same year, the X1 was introduced as the 5th model in Thailand. A year later, the X3 followed.

Current models
 BMW 220i Gran Coupe (2020–present; CKD)
 BMW 3 Series (2012–present)
 BMW 5 Series (2010–present)
 BMW 7 Series (2001–present)
 BMW X1 (2009–present)
 BMW X3 (2003–present)
 BMW X4 (2021–present)
 BMW X5 (2020–present)
 BMW X6 (2022–present)
 BMW X7 (2021–present; CKD xDrive30d and 2022–present; CKD xDrive40d)

Imported 
 BMW 2 Series (2014–present, imported from BMW Group Plant Leipzig)
 BMW 218i Gran Coupe (2019–present, imported from BMW Group Plant Leipzig)
 BMW 2 Series Active Tourer / BMW 2 Series Gran Tourer (2018–present, imported from BMW Group Plant Leipzig)
 BMW 3 Series Gran Sedan (2021–present, imported from Inokom: 330Li M Sport and 320Li Luxury)
 BMW 4 Series (2013–present, imported from BMW AG Plant München, Regensburg and BMW Group Plant Dingolfing)
 BMW 6 Series Gran Turismo (2019–present, imported from BMW Group Plant Dingolfing: 630d GT and 2020–present, imported from Inokom: 630i GT)
 BMW 8 Series (2018–present, imported from BMW Group Plant Dingolfing)
 BMW Z4 (2019–present, imported from Magna Steyr)
 BMW M2 Coupé (F87) (2018–present, imported from BMW Group Plant Leipzig)
 BMW M4 (2014–present, imported from BMW Group plant 6.10 Regensburg)
 BMW M5 (2017–present, imported from BMW Group Plant Dingolfing)
 BMW M8 (2019–present, imported from BMW Group Plant Dingolfing)
 BMW X2 (2018–present, imported from BMW AG Plant Regensburg)
 BMW X3 M (2019–present, imported from BMW Manufacturing Co, LLC)
 BMW X4 M Sport X (2021–present, imported from Inokom)
 BMW X4 M (2019–present, imported from BMW Manufacturing Co, LLC)
 BMW X5 (2013–present, imported from BMW Manufacturing Co, LLC)
 BMW X6 xDrive30d (2020–present, imported from BMW Manufacturing Co, LLC)
 BMW XM (2023–present, imported from BMW Manufacturing Co, LLC)
 BMW i3 / i3s (2015–present, imported from BMW Group Plant Leipzig)
 BMW iX3 (2021–present, imported from BMW Brilliance Automotive Ltd.)
 BMW iX xDrive 40 / 50 Sport (2021–present, imported from BMW Group Plant Dingolfing)
 BMW i4 eDrive40 M Sport / M50 (2022–present, imported from BMW Group Plant Munich)
 BMW M240i xDrive (2022–present, imported from BMW Mexico)
 BMW M4 CSL (2022–present, imported from BMW Group Plant 6.10 Regensburg)
 BMW M440i xDrive Coupe (G22) (2022–present, imported from BMW Group Plant Dingolfing)
 BMW i7 (2022–present, imported from BMW Group Plant Dingolfing)

Former models

Manufactured locally 
 BMW 1 Series (F20) (2011–2019)
 BMW 3-series Gran Turismo (F34) (2013–2019)

Imported 
 BMW 6 Series Coupe, Convertible and Gran Coupe (2011–2018, imported from BMW Group Plant Dingolfing)
 BMW i8 (2016–2020, imported from BMW Group Plant Leipzig)
 BMW X7 M50d (2019–2020, imported from BMW Manufacturing Co, LLC)

References

External links 
 Website of BMW Group Thailand

Car manufacturers of Thailand
BMW
Motor vehicle assembly plants in Thailand
1998 establishments in Thailand
Vehicle manufacturing companies established in 1998